United Nations Security Council resolution 719, adopted unanimously on 6 November 1991, after recalling resolutions 637 (1989), 644 (1989), 675 (1990) and 691 (1991), the Council endorsed a report by the Secretary-General and decided to extend the mandate of the United Nations Observer Group in Central America for a further five months and twenty-three days until 30 April 1992.

The resolution requested the Secretary-General to report back before the end of the current mandate on all aspects of the Observer Group, indicating if any changes regarding its future are required.

See also
 History of Central America
 History of Nicaragua
 List of United Nations Security Council Resolutions 701 to 800 (1991–1993)

References
Text of the Resolution at undocs.org

External links
 

 0719
History of Central America
Politics of Central America
History of Nicaragua
November 1991 events